Malorad Glacier is the 14 km long and 10.5 km wide glacier on Trinity Peninsula, Antarctic Peninsula.  Situated north of Russell West Glacier, and bounded by Marescot Ridge to the northeast, Louis-Philippe Plateau to the southeast,  Srednogorie Heights to the south and Hanson Hill to the southwest.  Draining northwestwards to enter Bransfield Strait east of Cape Roquemaurel and west of Thanaron Point.

The glacier is named after the settlement of Malorad in northwestern Bulgaria.

Location
German-British mapping in 1996.

See also
 List of glaciers in the Antarctic
 Glaciology

Maps
 Trinity Peninsula. Scale 1:250000 topographic map No. 5697. Institut für Angewandte Geodäsie and British Antarctic Survey, 1996.
 Antarctic Digital Database (ADD). Scale 1:250000 topographic map of Antarctica. Scientific Committee on Antarctic Research (SCAR), 1993–2016.

References
 Bulgarian Antarctic Gazetteer. Antarctic Place-names Commission. (details in Bulgarian, basic data in English)
 Malorad Glacier SCAR Composite Antarctic Gazetteer

External links
 Malorad Glacier. Copernix satellite image

Glaciers of Trinity Peninsula
Bulgaria and the Antarctic